The Cokeville Elementary School hostage crisis occurred on Friday, May 16, 1986 in Cokeville, Wyoming, United States, when former town marshal David Young, 43, and his wife Doris Young, 47, took 136 children and 18 adults hostage at Cokeville Elementary School.

David Young entered the school with his wife transporting a large gasoline-filled device that appeared to be a bomb. The couple corralled a large group of students and teachers into a single classroom. David attached the bomb trigger to his wrist and threatened the group that he might, at any time, move his arm and ignite the bomb.

After a two-and-a-half hour standoff, the children were becoming restless, so the teachers preoccupied the kids in the form of movies, games, prayer, and books. David became increasingly agitated, and decided to leave the room. Before leaving the room, David attached the bomb's detonation device to his wife's wrist.

When the children became increasingly loud, Doris Young began begging the teachers to settle the group down. Eventually Doris lifted her arm sharply and the bomb went off prematurely, injuring Doris while David was out of the room. Returning to the scene, David shot his wife, a teacher, then himself. All the hostages escaped, though 79 were later hospitalized with burns and injuries, the majority of which were severe.

Background 

David Young was the only police officer in Cokeville for six months in 1979. After being fired for misconduct, he moved to Tucson, Arizona, where he married Doris Young.

Both David and Doris had ties to white supremacist groups, including the Posse Comitatus and the Aryan Nations.

Prior to the hostage crisis, David had tested a similar bomb in a sealed school bus in Arizona, destroying it.

David and Doris both returned to Cokeville on May 16, 1986. At 1:00 pm, they pulled up to the Cokeville Elementary School and unloaded a gasoline bomb, along with four rifles and nine handguns. Vengeance for having been fired did not seem to have been the motive, but rather a philosophy recorded in journal entries referring to a Brave New World where he wanted to reign over intelligent children. He had been aware of above-average achievement scores from Cokeville's education system. Journal entries also indicate that he saw opportunity in the close-knit community; he wrote, "Threaten one and all are at your mercy." David went to the school office, handing out a manifesto titled "ZERO EQUALS INFINITY" and announcing "This is a revolution!" Teachers were confused and baffled by Young's nonsensical, strange writing. Meanwhile, Doris went from classroom to classroom, luring 136 children, six faculty, nine teachers, and three other adults, including a job applicant and a UPS driver, into a first-grade classroom for a total of 154 hostages. She lured them by telling them there was either an emergency, a surprise, or an assembly there.

David Young had initially planned to involve longtime friends Gerald Deppe and Doyle Mendenhall, who had invested money with him in a get-rich-quick scheme that he had called "The Biggie." The two men eventually refused to participate in the event. Both men were handcuffed in a van outside the school.

David's youngest daughter from his first marriage, Princess, entered the elementary school with David and Doris, but refused to carry out the plan, leaving to report the incident at the town hall.

Princess, Deppe, and Mendenhall were never charged in relation to this crime because of their refusal to participate.

Bomb anatomy 
The bomb was an improvised explosive device constructed in a small two-wheeled shopping cart with two baskets, one on top of the other. The top basket contained a gallon milk jug of gasoline, wired with a blasting cap. Below the jug in the bottom basket were two tuna fish cans filled with a mixture of aluminum powder and flour meant to aerosolize and deflagrate following detonation, each with its own blasting cap. Throughout both baskets were chain links, gunpowder, and boxes of ammunition acting as shrapnel. The mechanism was triggered by a dead man's switch, consisting of a wooden piece separating two metal connectors within the jaws of a clothespin, forming an incomplete circuit. The circuit was powered by a 9-volt lantern battery. Once the wooden piece was removed, the two metal connectors completed the circuit, detonating the bomb. The wooden piece was tied to Doris' wrist by a string.

The jug of gasoline had a pinhole-sized leak on its bottom. This allowed gasoline to drip into the tuna fish cans, turning the aluminum-flour mixture into paste, unable to aerosolize. The leaking gasoline's fumes prompted teachers to open the classroom windows, unknowingly creating vents for the impending explosion.

Two of the three blasting caps on the bomb failed to detonate; the wires to each tuna can had been reportedly cut. The blasting cap in the gasoline jug functioned properly, initiating the explosion. The reason for the wire cuts are so far unexplained.

Standoff 

In the classroom, David held the gasoline bomb, with the triggering mechanism attached to a string tied around his wrist. He demanded a ransom of two million dollars per hostage ($308 million, $720 million adjusted for inflation), and an audience with President Ronald Reagan. David had also sent a copy of the manifesto to Reagan. With permission, the teachers brought in books, art supplies and a television to help keep the children occupied. Meanwhile, police and parents gathered out of sight of the school room where hostages were gathered. Doris tried numerous times to calm the children by telling them to "think of it as an adventure movie," or that they "would have a great story to tell their grandchildren." Many children showed signs of distress with sobs, complaining of headaches from the smell of gasoline from the bomb, or simply wanting to go home. One hostage observed a birthday on that day and songs were sung in his honor. The hostage takers took part in the singing. The mood did not lift with the singing and teachers quickly negotiated with the hostage takers to get items from the library to help the kids get their minds off the siege, and help to pass the time. Windows were opened to rid the room of gasoline fumes, and prayers were offered in small groups among the children.

Throughout the standoff, David grew increasingly agitated and irritable. With fear that David might become unhinged, the teachers decided to make an ~8-foot square of masking tape for his own personal space.

Bombing and death of the perpetrators 

About 2 1/2 hours into the standoff, David transferred the triggering mechanism of the bomb to Doris' wrist, and went to a small bathroom that connected the first and second grade rooms. Doris developed a headache from the gasoline fumes, and raised her hand to her forehead. This unintentionally activated the triggering mechanism and the bomb exploded, severely injuring Doris, and filling the room with black smoke and pockets of fire. Immediately following the detonation, the teachers started to shove children into the hallway, and through two open windows onto the grass outside the school, causing chaos as panicked parents tried to break through police lines. The subsequent police report states that David opened the door from the connecting bathroom, shot his injured wife in the head and killed her, shot and wounded John Miller, a music teacher who was trying to flee, then closed the bathroom door and killed himself with a shot from a .45 pistol to the head. During the chaos, Doris' burnt body was expelled through a window, and left lying on the front lawn.

When the bomb detonated, the majority of the explosive force was channeled through loose ceiling tiles into the roof, and open windows acting as vents. This significantly mitigated the explosive power of the bomb.

Aftermath 

All told, 79 of the hostages suffered injuries, mostly second-degree burns, smoke inhalation, and other injuries from the exploding bomb. The injured were triaged to several area hospitals in Wyoming and Idaho.

Media 

The incident was detailed in the book The Cokeville Miracle: When Angels Intervene by Hartt Wixom and his wife Judene, published by Cedar Fort, Inc., which formed the basis for a CBS made-for-TV movie titled To Save the Children. In 2006, the Cokeville Miracle Foundation compiled a book of recollections about the day from parents, emergency workers and former hostages. The story was also featured on Unsolved Mysteries, Unexplained Mysteries, and I Survived...

A movie about the incident, The Cokeville Miracle, was made by filmmaker T. C. Christensen and released on June 5, 2015.

References

External links 

 Cokeville Miracle Foundation (Archive)
 IMDB listing for To Save the Children and The Cokeville Miracle
 Transcription of Zero Equals Infinity, the document David Young handed to school officials upon entering the elementary school. (2020-06-23, Link no longer working)

1986 crimes in the United States
Attacks in the United States in 1986
History of Wyoming
School bombings in the United States
Hostage taking in the United States
Lincoln County, Wyoming
Explosions in 1986
Criminal duos
1986 in Wyoming
Crime in Wyoming
Murder–suicides in Wyoming
Improvised explosive device bombings in the United States